Roanoke-Benson High School is a comprehensive high school located at 208 West High Street, in Roanoke, Illinois.  The school is a member of the Tri-County Conference, and compete under the name Rockets.

References

Educational institutions in the United States with year of establishment missing
Public high schools in Illinois
Schools in Woodford County, Illinois